Yauco may refer to:
 Yauco, Puerto Rico, a municipio of Puerto Rico
 Yauco barrio-pueblo, administrative center of Yauco
 Yauco metropolitan area, a metro area 
 Yauco River, a river
 Yauco Battle Site, in 19th century battle site